The Drowned Cities is a 2012 young adult novel by Paolo Bacigalupi set in a post-apocalyptic future. The book is a sequel to Ship Breaker.

Reception
The Drowned Cities was reviewed by Adi Robertson of The Verge, who wrote that the book "stands out as one of the most brutal pieces of YA fiction in recent years". According to Robertson, the book takes place in a realistic post-apocalyptic universe, and while the book takes on the theme of corrupting power, it is "almost uplifting".

References

2012 American novels
American young adult novels
Children's science fiction novels
Dystopian novels
Novels by Paolo Bacigalupi
Climate change novels
Little, Brown and Company books